Streptomyces minutiscleroticus is a bacterium species from the genus of Streptomyces. Streptomyces minutiscleroticus produces the antibiotic aburamycin.

See also 
 List of Streptomyces species

Notes

References

Further reading

External links
Type strain of Streptomyces minutiscleroticus at BacDive -  the Bacterial Diversity Metadatabase

minutiscleroticus
Bacteria described in 1970